This is a list of fellows of the Royal Society elected in 1696.

Fellows 
Silvestro Bonfigliuoli  (1637–1696)
Ippolito Fornasari  (1628–1697)
James Chadwick  (1660–1697)
Vincenzo Viviani  (1622–1703)
Charles Bernard  (1650–1711)
Francesco Spoleti  (d. 1712)
Govard Bidloo  (1649–1713)
John Harris  (1666–1719)
Edward Smith  (1665–1720)
Ralph Lowndes  (1662–1727)
Orlando Bridgeman  (d. 1731)
Thomas Foley 1st Baron Foley of Kidderminster (d. 1733)
Sir Philip Ryley  (d. 1733)
John Newey  (1664–1735)
Hugh Howard  (1675–1737)
William Cockburn  (1669–1739)
William Byrd  (1674–1744)
Henry Petty 1st Earl of Shelburne (1675–1751)
Pomponio Scarlotti Baron of (b. 1696)

References

1696
1696 in science
1696 in England